San Pietro di Feletto is a comune (municipality) in the Province of Treviso in the Italian region Veneto, located about  north of Venice and about  north of Treviso.

Main sights
The Pieve (Pleban church) of San Pietro, dating to the 11th century and perhaps built over the ruins of a Pagan temple, has a medieval portal under which are five frescoes of St. Antony Abbot, Virgin with Child, Virgin with Saints, Sacrifice of Cain and Abel and Sunday Christ. The interior, with a nave and two aisles, has frescoes from the 12th-15th centuries. The apse features  a Christ Pantocrator between the Virgin and St. Peter dating to the 13th century.

References

Cities and towns in Veneto